The qualification event for the curling tournament at the 2014 Winter Olympics was held from December 10 to 15, 2013 at the BLZ Arena in Füssen, Germany. The top two teams from the qualification event qualified their nations to participate in the Olympics. The qualification event was open to any nations that earned qualification points at the 2012 or 2013 World Curling Championships or participated at the 2011 World Curling Championships (the South Korea men's team and the Norway women's team).

Competition format
In both the men's and the women's tournaments, the teams played a single round robin, and at its conclusion, the top three teams advanced to the playoffs. In the playoffs, the first and second seeds played a game to determine the first team to advance to the main Olympic tournament. The loser of this game, along with the third seed, played a game to determine the second team to advance to the main Olympic tournament.

Men

Teams

Round-robin standings
Final round-robin standings

Round-robin results
All draw times are listed in Central European Time (UTC+1).

Draw 1
Tuesday, December 10, 16:00

Draw 2
Wednesday, December 11, 8:00

Draw 3
Wednesday, December 11, 16:00

Draw 4
Thursday, December 12, 9:00

Draw 5
Thursday, December 12, 19:00

Draw 6
Friday, December 13, 12:00

Draw 7
Friday, December 13, 20:00

Tiebreaker
Saturday, December 14, 16:00

Playoffs

First qualifier
Saturday, December 14, 20:00

Second qualifier
Sunday, December 15, 12:30

Women

Teams

Round-robin standings
Final round-robin standings

Round-robin results
All draw times are listed in Central European Time (UTC+1).

Draw 1
Tuesday, December 10, 20:00

Draw 2
Wednesday, December 11, 12:00

Draw 3
Wednesday, December 11, 20:00

Draw 4
Thursday, December 12, 14:00

Draw 5
Friday, December 13, 8:00

Draw 6
Friday, December 13, 16:00

Draw 7
Saturday, December 14, 8:00

Tiebreaker
Saturday, December 14, 16:00

Playoffs

First qualifier
Sunday, December 15, 8:30

Second qualifier
Sunday, December 15, 16:30

References
General

Specific

External links

qualification
Winter Olympics qualification
Qualification events for the 2014 Winter Olympics
2013 in German sport
International curling competitions hosted by Germany